Bandar Darulaman is a new residential area in Jitra, Kubang Pasu District, Kedah, Malaysia.

It is famous for its recreational park, Taman Darulaman, with its own lake for water activities like boating and fishing. The area is easily accessible by the PLUS Expressway.

Education
SMK Darulaman
SK Bandar Baru Darulaman

Kubang Pasu District
Towns in Kedah